Nintendo, a Japanese home and handheld video game console manufacturer and game developer, has traditionally focused on games that utilize unique elements of its consoles. However, the growth of the mobile gaming market in the early 2010s led to several successive fiscal quarters where they were running at a loss. Nintendo, led by president Satoru Iwata at the time, developed a strategy for entering into the mobile games market with development partner DeNA, as a means of introducing their franchise properties to mobile players with a goal of bringing them to buy Nintendo's consoles later. Since 2015, Nintendo has internally developed a number of mobile games, while also publishing games with other developers, including games outside of the initial DeNA partnership.

History

Prior to 2015
Leading into the 2010s, Nintendo principally offered its home console, the Wii, and its portable console the Nintendo DS, along with several in-house games of their major franchises, such as Super Mario and The Legend of Zelda, a business method that had worked for the company for the previous 30 years. A distinguishing element of Nintendo's approach compared to other video game hardware computes was its unique take on hardware that allowed for novel gameplay elements, such as the motion-sensing Wii Remote and the dual-screen nature of the DS line. Nintendo is also unique in that their first-party games depend on their unique hardware, making a significant portion of their revenues tied to the success of these games.

However, the 2010s also saw the growth of mobile gaming with wide adoption of smartphones and tablet computers.

As mobile gaming grew, Nintendo was criticized for not taking risks in this area, prompted when the valuation of GungHo Online Entertainment, the publishers of the financially successful Puzzle & Dragons, exceeded that of Nintendo's in June 2013. These concerns were also compounded by lower-than-projected sales numbers for the successors of Nintendo's consoles, the Wii U and Nintendo 3DS, which had caused Nintendo's stock price to drop.  In an interview with The Wall Street Journal during E3 2013, Nintendo's president Satoru Iwata addressed the lure of developing for the mobile market, but had opted to not take Nintendo in that direction, focusing instead on providing compelling games that would drive their hardware sales, retaining their unique approach. Iwata said that while they could easily obtain short-term gains by addressing the mobile market, "20 years down the line, we may look back at the decision not to supply Nintendo games to smartphones and think that is the reason why the company is still here." Previously, Iwata had asserted that "Nintendo would cease to be Nintendo" if they started development for mobile games. The company was also against simply making games from their core franchises available for mobile, with Nintendo of America president Reggie Fils-Aimé saying "When the consumer wants to play Mario, Zelda, and Pokémon, they have to purchase our hardware to do so. And that preserves our overall financial model."

The only exception that Nintendo had made for mobile gaming has been limited licensing of its properties, particularly the Pokémon property, via The Pokémon Company, to third-party developers who made games on a variety of platforms. Some of these titles were games developed for non-mobile devices and later brought to mobile, such as Pokémon TCG Online (initially released in 2011 for web browsers, and brought to mobile in 2014) and Pokémon Shuffle (initially released on Nintendo 3DS in early 2015, arriving on mobile later that year). Nintendo has licensed other properties, for example, the Chinese mobile game King of Glory (known as Arena of Valor in Western markets) has used Mario characters under license from Nintendo.

The decision to stay out of the mobile gaming area, along with poor sales of the Wii U, lead Nintendo to undergo several underperforming quarters up through 2014. With Nintendo issuing a lowering of its financial forecast for its 2014 fiscal year, Iwata said "Given the expansion of smart devices, we are naturally studying how smart devices can be used to grow the game-player business," but that "It's not as simple as enabling Mario to move on a smartphone." In the fiscal report to investors that year, Iwata wrote "... I believe that the era has ended when people play all kinds of games only on dedicated gaming systems."

2015–present
Following the end of the 2014 fiscal year, Iwata, Tatsumi Kimishima, Genyo Takeda, and Shigeru Miyamoto crafted a new strategy for Nintendo to bring them back into profitability, which included approaching the mobile market, creating new hardware, and "maximizing [their] intellectual property" The hardware direction resulted in the development of the Nintendo Switch, released in March 2017. While promoted as a home console, the Switch can operate in several modes similar to a handheld console and a tablet computer.

For the mobile gaming area, Iwata initiated discussions with DeNA, a large Japanese mobile platform developer and provider. By March 2015, Nintendo and DeNA announced a partnership to jointly develop at least five mobile game titles, with one title planned to be released by the end of that year. Part of this deal including Nintendo acquiring 10% of DeNA's stock, while DeNA obtained about 1.24% of Nintendo's. Iwata said that Nintendo had found a way with DeNA to bring its franchises to mobile devices that took advantage of unique control methods offered by these devices. "We have come to the stage where we can say that we will be able to develop and operate software which, in the end, will not hurt the value of Nintendo IP but, rather, will become an opportunity for the great number of people around the world who own smart devices—but do not have interest in dedicated video game hardware—to be interested in Nintendo IP and eventually to become fans of our dedicated game systems." At the time of announcement, Nintendo had not committed to whether their mobile games would be free-to-play or require a single up-front cost, but Iwata did assure that they would stay to payment schemes that parents would be comfortable with for letting their children play. Iwata also said that Nintendo would be able to avoid issues that other mobile developers had, where their success usually rested on one key game; Nintendo instead can take advantage of several of their franchises and develop a range of games.

Iwata died from health complications in July 2015, and Kimishima was named Nintendo's new president. Kimishima continued to have Nintendo follow the mobile approach that Iwata had set forward, considering it a core pillar of Nintendo's strategy. In statements to investors made in November 2017, Kimishima acknowledged Nintendo was still adapting to mobile, pointing to missed expectations with Super Mario Run, stating:
Nintendo has a large stock of valuable IP characters and has developed many games. We cannot, however, simply port our existing games and IP to smart-device applications. A lot of thought is going into what kind of games for smart devices will further our business and how we can continue to foster good relationships with our existing dedicated video game platform business. Among the various ideas, a primary concern is enabling our consumers to play on not only smart devices, but also our dedicated video game systems. We want to build up the smart-device business as a core pillar of Nintendoʼs various businesses, but we have not yet reached that level. Nintendo is not at a stage where we can consider becoming a smart-device platform developer.

Near the end of calendar year 2017, Nintendo was reportedly in talks with additional mobile platform providers including GungHo to expand their mobile game offerings, as well as extending their current DeNA deal, according to The Wall Street Journal.

Upon announcement of the jointly developed and operated title Dragalia Lost in April 2018, Nintendo also announced it had acquired about a 5% stake in Japanese mobile game developer Cygames. Around the same time, Kimishima announced he was stepping down as Nintendo's president, to be replaced by Shuntaro Furukawa. Furukawa stated that he plans to continue Nintendo's drive into mobile games towards being a  revenue source for the company, and try to create more games that were as successful as Pokémon Go.

In June 2020, an article from Bloomberg stated that Nintendo was unlikely to further pursue major efforts on the mobile market. While they still would publish and develop games for it and maintain the current ones already available, they would focus less on the mobile market as the success of the Nintendo Switch console would make them to be able to do that. Nintendo joined the mobile market due to the failure of the Wii U and pressure from investors but now the company could sustain itself from the already released games between the successful ones on mobile, and also on Switch.

In its 80th shareholder meeting in June 2020, president and CEO Furukawa answered a question in the Q&A about the mobile business
and confirmed that while the company don't have any new title to announce as right now, and while mobile still is a secondary market and don't make as much money as console for the company, the business still remains important to the company for different reasons outside of revenue including exposure of the brand of Nintendo, its franchises and the establishment of Nintendo accounts into customers.

In March 2021, Nintendo and Niantic announced a partnership to created mobile games based in Nintendo IP for AR, similar to Pokémon Go. The games will be licensed to Niantic who will be the publisher and developer, with the Pikmin franchise being the first game to be released at the end of 2021.

Games
Nintendo, through either its internal development division such as Entertainment Planning & Development division (EPD), or its closely affiliated studios such as Intelligent Systems, have developed at least five mobile apps in partnership with DeNA with Miitomo, Super Mario Run, Fire Emblem Heroes, Animal Crossing: Pocket Camp and Mario Kart Tour. The other games otherwise are outside of that partnership.

Miitomo (2016) 
Miitomo was the first mobile app developed through the Nintendo/DeNA partnership, released in March 2016. It was a social networking game, having players interact with their virtual Mii avatars and those of others through the My Nintendo service. The game used a freemium structure, allowing players to use real-world money to purchase in-game currency (which could also be earned through other in-game actions) that can be then used to buy customization options for the player's Mii within the game. Miitomo attracted more than 10 million downloads within a month of its release, though interest waned in the following months. Nintendo ended support for the app in May 2018.

Super Mario Run (2016) 
Super Mario Run was first released in December 2016 for iOS, and a few months later for Android. The game is a type of auto runner, where the player guides Mario and other characters through a course to collect coins, only requiring the player to control the timing and length of Mario's jump. Nintendo had planned on profiting on the sale of conversions from the demo into the full game. While the game was downloaded more than 200 million times, topping app store charts, Nintendo affirmed that they had not reached a 10% target conversion rate worldwide, but were still exploring this approach for future titles. Analytics firm Sensor Tower estimated that Super Mario Run had about $56 million in revenue in its first year.

Fire Emblem Heroes (2017) 
Fire Emblem Heroes was first released in February 2017, developed primarily by Intelligent Systems. It uses the same tactical role-playing game elements from the Fire Emblem series, in which players control a party of heroes to battle foes. Unlike Super Mario Run, Fire Emblem Heroes used a more traditional free-to-play model; players could play as many missions as they could while their party still had stamina, which otherwise refreshes by waiting some amount of time or by using in-game purchases to restore stamina and heal the party. In-app purchases could also be used to purchase new heroes for the player's party. While the game was only downloaded 10 million times by April 2017, it had made , about 10 times more reported for Super Mario Run.

Animal Crossing: Pocket Camp (2017) 
Animal Crossing: Pocket Camp was released in October 2017. Based on the Animal Crossing series, the game is a social simulation game that has the player work to earn a living and improve their home in a town filled with anthropomorphic creatures. Like Fire Emblem Heroes, Nintendo used a free-to-play mechanism, allowing players to purchase in-game items that reduce activity cooldown timers. The title was downloaded more than 15 million times within its first week of release. Sensor Tower estimated the game exceeded  in revenue within about 10 months from its release.

Dragalia Lost (2018) 
Dragalia Lost is an action role-playing game developed by Cygames. It was announced in April 2018, and launched in Japan, Taiwan, and the United States on September 27, 2018. By July 2019, The game generated over 100 million in revenue. Dragalia Lost was shut down on November 30, 2022.

Dr. Mario World (2019) 
In January 2019, Nintendo announced Dr. Mario World, a part of the Dr. Mario series, would release for iOS and Android devices, co-developed by Nintendo EPD, Line Corporation, and NHN Entertainment. The game was initially released on July 9, 2019, in 59 territories, and follows the approach set by Candy Crush Saga. As with Dr. Mario, players attempts to clear colored viruses on a stage by matching 2-colored capsules in a match-3 style game. Rather than an open-ended game, Dr. Mario World follows the approach for mobile games set by Candy Crush Saga, with each level designed with a fixed number and location of viruses and blocks, and the player required to complete the level with a limited number of capsules. Monetization is also similar to Candy Crush Saga - the player earns coins in-game and can spend real-world money on diamonds, both which then can be used to purchase special power-ups, or new doctor characters such as Dr. Peach, Dr. Yoshi, and Dr. Toad each with their own unique skill. On July 28, 2021, Nintendo announced that they would be ending service for the game starting on October 31, 2021  however they did not give a reason as to why.

Mario Kart Tour (2019) 
In January 2018, Nintendo announced a mobile version of the Mario Kart series, Mario Kart Tour, for iOS and Android devices. Nintendo announced in April 2019 that they would be holding a closed beta for the game, exclusively for Android users, which took place from late May to early June. Initially expected to be released by March 2019, the game was released on September 25, 2019. The game was downloaded more than 10 million times on its first day, beating the previous first-day record holder Pokémon Go which had 6.7 million, according to Apptopia.

Pikmin Bloom (2021) 

In March 2021, Nintendo and Niantic announced a partnership with games developed and published by Niantic for mobile, with the Pikmin franchise being the first one to be released in 2021.

Pokémon games
In addition to those games, The Pokémon Company licensed the Pokémon intellectual property to third-party developers for mobile Pokémon games, with the only cases so far being with Niantic which develop and manages Pokémon Go and DeNA which develop and manages Pokémon Masters. In addition to this, The Pokémon Company publish and manages Pokémon games developed by contracted third-party developers for mobile.

Pokémon TCG Online (2011) 
Pokémon TCG Online is a digital recreation of the physical Pokémon Trading Card Game. It was developed by Dire Wolf Digital and released originally in 2011 for web browsers, and later developing dedicated versions for Microsoft Windows and macOS personal computers. The game was then brought to mobile devices in 2014 and 2015. Like most trading/collectible card games, players were able to buy booster packs of cards with in-game currency or through an online shop with real-funds, use those to construct decks, and challenge other players to matches.

Pokémon Shuffle Mobile (2015) 
Pokémon Shuffle Mobile is a tile matching puzzle game, along the style of Pokémon Battle Trozei, where players try to match tiles on a grid to deal damage to the enemy Pokémon. The game was developed by Genius Sonority and released for the Nintendo 3DS in early 2015; the mobile version was released later that year.

Pokémon Duel (2016) 
Pokémon Duel is a digital adaption of the Pokémon Trading Figure Game, where players use collectable figurines as their game tokens. It was developed by Heron and released to mobile devices in early 2016 in Japan, and later worldwide in 2017. The game has been shut down on October 31, 2019.

Pokémon Go (2016) 
Pokémon Go was developed and published by Niantic, and was released for mobile devices in July 2016. Pokémon Go is an augmented reality game, having players seek and try to capture virtual Pokémon marked at real-world locations. The game was available as a free-to-play download, using in-app purchases to buy Poké Balls for capturing Pokémon and other in-game boosts. The game was considered a worldwide success; by September 2016, it had been downloaded over 500 million times worldwide, and became the fastest game to make over $500 million in revenue.

In 2019 and 2020, Niantic, the Pokémon Company, and Nintendo will release a device called Pokémon Go Plus + that serves as an accelerometer that can track a user's movement patterns and integrate with Pokémon Go. They will also release Pokémon Sleep, an app that connects to Pokémon Go Plus + to track a user's sleep patterns, which will lead benefits to the player in their Pokémon Go game.

Pokémon: Magikarp Jump (2017) 
Pokémon: Magikarp Jump is a digital pet-stylized game, where players must fish for and capture the Pokémon Magikarp, and then train it to increase its ability to jump out of water, and then take challenges that test how well the Magikarp has been trained. It was developed by Select Button and released in May 2017.

Pokémon Quest (2018) 
Pokémon Quest is an action role-playing game spin-off of the series, available for the Nintendo Switch in May 2018 and for mobile devices the month after. Using voxel-based representations of the Pokémon, players explore a world with a team of three Pokémon, building up a home base to lure new Pokémon to join them, and facing off against opponent Pokémon in a real-time battle. The game is described as "free to start" in that there are no costs to download the title, but can require monetary purchases to speed up certain actions.

Pokémon Rumble Rush (2019) 
Pokémon Rumble Rush is an action beat 'em up game, and the fifth entry in the Pokémon Rumble spin-off series. The game was initially launched in May 2019 for Android users in Australia, before launching later for iOS and in other countries. Similarly to previous Rumble titles, the game feature toy Pokémon which are controlled by the player via tap controls. The game's progression focuses on moving between "islands", which consist of levels where the player's toy Pokémon fight against other toy Pokémon, and completing the level by defeating a boss for that level. Pokémon Rumble Rush was discontinued on July 22, 2020.

Pokémon Masters/Pokémon Masters EX (2019) 
Developed and published by DeNA, Pokémon Masters allows players to collect teams of Pokémon trainers and masters, along with their favored Pokémon, and create teams of three that can be used in battles with computer or human opponents. In August 2020, the game was renamed as Pokémon Masters EX in celebration of its first anniversary.

Pokémon Smile (2020) 
An app to help young children to brush their teeth in a fun way. Released in June 2020.

Pokémon Café Mix (2020) 
Developed by Genius Sonority, the puzzle game Pokémon Café Mix was announced in June 2020 and launched on the same month.

Pokémon UNITE (2021) 
Developed by TiMi Studios, the MOBA game Pokémon UNITE was initially announced in June 2020. In June 2021, it was announced that the game is set to release for Nintendo Switch in July 2021, and for mobile devices in September 2021.

Pokémon Sleep (TBA) 
Pokémon Sleep was initially announced in May 2019, and has yet to launch as of February 2023. The game tracks the amount of time a user sleeps, using the accelerometer of the external Pokémon Go Plus accessory, and communicates the data to the user's mobile device via Bluetooth for sleep-related game play. Though not much is known about the exact game play yet, The Pokémon Company has promised it will turn "sleeping into entertainment" in a similar way to how the Pokémon franchise's other mobile game, Pokémon Go, turned the act of walking into entertainment.

Other mobile apps

Nintendo Switch Parental Controls
The Nintendo Switch Parental Controls is a companion mobile app to the Nintendo Switch. Although the console itself includes standard parental control settings, the app introduces additional features such as monitoring game play activities of child users, setting daily time limits, and a manual software suspension function. Standard parental control settings can also be configured via this app. This is made possible via child accounts registered on a parent's own Nintendo Account. The app was launched alongside the Nintendo Switch in March 2017.

Nintendo Switch Online

While the Nintendo Switch has various online and networking functionalities, Nintendo elected to use a separate mobile app, Nintendo Switch Online, for features such as in-game voice chat, adding friends, and managing of the Switch Online subscription service to access more advanced features. According to Fils-Aimé, they wanted to use a mobile app for these features so that players could take advantage of their existing mobile devices that are already geared for aspects like voice chat, and to eliminate some of the latency problems that players may encounter if they were playing the Switch in its handheld mode. The app was released in July 2017 in some countries. The app was soft-launched in July 2017, alongside the release of Splatoon 2. A full version of the app was released in September 2018.

WeChat
Although the Nintendo Switch officially launched in mainland China in December 2019 in partnership with Tencent, Switch units officially distributed in mainland China lack support for the Nintendo Account log in system, which is required to use the Nintendo Switch's Parental Controls and Switch Online mobile apps as available in other markets. However, Tencent replaced Nintendo's online services with their own WeChat log in system integrated into the Chinese Nintendo Switch system software. Consequently, Tencent embedded additional widgets, or "mini programs", to their WeChat mobile app to give Chinese Nintendo Switch users an alternative method for support functionality such as remote parental controls and eShop pay support, as well as game-specific functions, such as the ability to track play statistics for Ring Fit Adventure.

Commercial impact
While these numbers did not quite meet expected revenues, Nintendo has asserted it still remains strong on the mobile strategy as to help lead mobile players into purchasing their consoles and games. Kimishimma said of these 2017 fiscal year numbers that "we have not reached a satisfactory profit point yet, so our goal is to further expand the scale of this business to develop it into one of the pillars of revenue".

In 2017, Rob Fahey of GamesIndustry.biz stated that the commercial success of Nintendo's mobile games were not as great as they could be, believing that while Fire Emblem Heroes had made the transition to mobile well, Nintendo was still struggling with how to take its IP into a mobile format that would entice people to play. He noted that while Super Mario Run approach to monetization was counter to most mobile titles, Animal Crossing: Pocket Camp was more of a standard free-to-play game, but lacked significant attention since its gameplay format was atypical for mobile devices.

Notes

References

Nintendo
Mobile games